Clitellaria ephippium is a species of soldier fly (so named for the thorns that armor the body) belonging to the family Stratiomyidae.

Distribution
This species is present in Austria, Belgium, Germany, Italy, Hungary, central and southern Russia, Spain and in Switzerland.

Description
The most of their body is black, with a bright red mesonotum. Antennae are no longer than the head, the third articulation of antennae is composed of five segments, the stylet of two segments. The eyes are dark and quite hairy. Scutellum is hairy and mesonotum shows two strong apico-lateral spines. Scutum has two strong lateral spines, placed between the transverse suture and the insertion of the wings. The abdomen is relatively wide. The wings are dark.

Biology
The predatory larvae of this species develop in ant nests, such as Lasius fuliginosus (synonym Formica fuliginosa) (Formicidae).

Bibliography
 Rozkošný, R. 1998. Chapter 24. Family Stratiomyidae. Manual Palaearct. Dipt. 2: 387-411.
 Joachim Haupt, Hiroko Haupt: Fliegen und Mücken. Beobachtung, Lebensweise. 1. Auflage. Naturbuch-Verlag, Jena und Stuttgart 1995, .

References

External links
 Biolib
 
 Animal Diversity Web

Stratiomyidae
Diptera of Europe
Insects described in 1775
Taxa named by Johan Christian Fabricius